Woolacott is a surname. Notable people with the surname include:

 Frank Woolacott (1903–1968), Australian architect and structural engineer
 J. E. Woolacott (1861–1936), British journalist

See also
 Wollacott, surname
 Woollacott, surname